Latham House is a historic home located at Plymouth, Washington County, North Carolina. It was built about 1850, and is a two-story, three bay by two bay, Greek Revival style frame dwelling on a high basement. It has a cross-gable roof, hip roofed wraparound porch, and is sheathed in weatherboard.  Plymouth citizens are believed to have taken refuge in its basement during the Battle of Plymouth in 1864.

It was listed on the National Register of Historic Places in 1976.  It is located in the Plymouth Historic District.

References

Houses on the National Register of Historic Places in North Carolina
Greek Revival houses in North Carolina
Houses completed in 1850
Houses in Washington County, North Carolina
National Register of Historic Places in Washington County, North Carolina
Historic district contributing properties in North Carolina